Diane S Leather Charles (7 January 19335 September 2018) was an English athlete who was the first woman to run a sub-5-minute mile.

Early life 
Leather was born in Streetly, Staffordshire. She was one of six children, and the only daughter, of Mabel (née Barringer) and James Leather, a surgeon. She played lacrosse as a child, and watching the 1952 Summer Olympics sparked her interest in athletics. While studying chemistry at the Birmingham College of Technology (now Aston University), she joined the Birchfield Harriers athletics club in Birmingham and was coached by Doris Nelson Neal. She later worked as an analytical chemist at the University of Birmingham.

Athletic career 
Neal saw that Leather had the potential to perform well in longer races, however at the time the longest recognised event in women's athletics was the 200-metre race. This limit had been adopted after six women collapsed at the finish line in an 800-metre race at the 1928 Olympics. Nevertheless, Neal coached Leather for racing the mile and the following year, she broke the world best time, running a mile in 5:02.6. Her achievement was labelled "world best" rather than "world record" by the IAAF as the distance was not officially recognised for a further 15 years.

On 29 May 1954, Leather broke the 5-minute barrier with a time of 4 minutes and 59.6 seconds during the Midlands Women's AAA Championships at Birmingham's Alexander Sports Ground. Coincidentally, it was only 23 days since Roger Bannister had become the first man to run a sub 4-minute mile, 100 km away. In 1955, Leather broke the mile record by a further 15 seconds, achieving her personal best of 4:45. This remained the world record for seven years until New Zealand's Marise Chamberlain ran 4:41.4 in 1962.

Leather won two European Championship silver medals at 800 metres: at the 1954 event in Bern, she was second behind the Soviet Union's Nina Otkalenko in 2:09.8, while at the 1958 event in Stockholm, she was second to another Soviet, Yelizaveta Yermolayeva, running 2:06.6. She was also a two-time winner of the women's race at the International Cross Country Championships in 1954 and 1955, and won the national cross country women's title four times.

She married Peter Charles, an industrial engineer turned financial consultant, in 1959, and competed in her final competition, the 1960 Summer Olympics in Rome, as Diane Charles. She was eliminated in the heats of the 800 metres, in 2:14.24. She held the British record for 1500m for 11 years and held claim to the world mark in the mile for 8 years in total.

Personal life
Charles retired from athletics at the age of 27 and lived in Cornwall for the remainder of her life. She worked for child protection agencies and was a volunteer for Cruse Bereavement Care and Samaritans. She was married for more than 55 years—her husband died in 2017—and had four children and 13 grandchildren. She died on 5 September 2018, aged 85, in Truro, Cornwall. She had recently suffered a stroke.

References

External links
 
 "Almost the 5 Minute Mile" Pathe newsreel featuring Leather, 31 May 1954

1933 births
2018 deaths
Sportspeople from Staffordshire
English female middle-distance runners
Birchfield Harriers
European Athletics Championships medalists
International Cross Country Championships winners
Athletes (track and field) at the 1960 Summer Olympics
Olympic athletes of Great Britain